James Lockie (4 January 1874 – 1955) was an English footballer active at the turn of the 20th century. He made a total of 7 appearances in The Football League for Newcastle United and Grimsby Town.

References

1874 births
English Football League players
Newcastle United F.C. players
Grimsby Town F.C. players
Gillingham F.C. players
1955 deaths
English footballers
Association football defenders